Dasypyga belizensis is a species of snout moth in the genus Dasypyga. It was described by Herbert H. Neunzig and L. C. Dow in 1993. It is found in Belize.

References

Moths described in 1993
Phycitinae